Zulu Djævleræs is a Danish reality television programme, currently hosted by Julie Ølgaard.

Every episode consists of 3 heats. The first two heats consists of all-men and all-women driving against each other. In the third heat, "Djævleheatet" (Danish: The Devil Heat), the couples themselves choose who is to drive. This heat includes obstacles, which change from episode to episode. In the third heat the drivers fights for double points.

Season 1
40 famous Danes competed in "folkeræs" (Danish: people's race) in pairs, 1 man and 1 woman.

The first four episodes was preliminary rounds. 5 couples competed here for 3 spots in the semi-finals. The heat-winner got 3 points, the runner-up 2 points and no. 3, 1 point. Half of the 12 couples in the semi-final qualified for the final. In the final stage the heat-winner won 4 points, second place 3 points and so on down to no. 4 who got 1 point.

Results

Preliminary rounds

Episode 1

Episode 2

Episode 3

Episode 4

Semi-finals

Episode 5

Episode 6

Final

External links
 TV 2 Zulu

Danish reality television series
2000s Danish television series
2007 Danish television series debuts
2007 Danish television series endings
Danish-language television shows
TV 2 Zulu original programming